The Batboat, Batstrike, or Batsub is the fictional personal aqua-dynamic hydrofoil/submersible watercraft of the DC Comics superhero Batman.

Batman's boats

Batskiboat
The Batskiboat is a version of the Batboat in the 1992 live-action film Batman Returns. Batman uses the jet-powered hydrofoil near the climax of the film to travel through Gotham's sewer system towards the Penguin's lair.

The Batskiboat's design is a cross between the film's Batmobile, a Killer whale and the figure of a shark. It is a single-seater and has the same extras as the Batmobile, including torpedo launchers. It also has a radar, which can be used by Batman to monitor each area of Gotham City.

Batstrike
The Batstrike is a neutral-buoyancy undersea scooter. The Batstrike carries submerged speeds in excess of 5 knots.

Batsub
The Bat-Submersible (or "Batsub") made its debut in May 1949 in Detective Comics #147. Batman and Robin employed the Bat-Sub in order to net Tiger Shark.

The Batsub (or Bat-Sub) is another fictional watercraft along with the Batboat used by the comic superhero Batman for alternative transportation purposes. In the 1995 film Batman Forever, a version of the Batwing is shown to have a cockpit that can transform into a submersible vehicle should the air vehicle be shot down. This mini submarine does not have armament and is only equipped with a search headlight.

Environment systems include CO2-scrubbers and air-conditioning units in the Bat-Submersible's stern. Oxygen tanks provide up to six hours of breathable air. There are also emergency tanks that allow an added twelve hours of life-support. The life-support includes oxygen/helium mixes for deep-water submersion.

Publication history
In Sub-Level 6 of the Batcave, there's an aqua-dynamic hydrofoil/submersible (otherwise known as the Batboat) on both the navigable Gotham River and the Atlantic Ocean's waters.

Background
Early in his career, while investigating arms dealers operating along the wharves of Gotham City's Chinatown district, Batman used a prototype Batboat to pursue the fleeing criminals. In what was later regarded as an "extreme measure", Batman destroyed their launch with a bow-mounted flame-thrower.

The first official Batboat made its debut in April 1946 (in Detective Comics #110). The storyline involved Scotland Yard providing Batman and Robin with the boat in order to speed their search for the villainous Professor Moriarty.

Hydrofoil
To submerge, the Batboat's foils retract to reduce parasitic drag. Its aluminum propellers are driven by sealed electrolyte batteries.

Cockpit
The Batboat displays include state-of-the-art 'at-a-glance' navigation and communication links, an ascent-rate alarm, a dive-time clock, and a safe-ceiling depth meter.

Offensive weapons
Batboat's armaments include a pneumatic harpoon, a launching grapnel, depth charges and active-homing torpedoes, often programmed to specifically target a target's propulsion system to disable it with a minimized risk of sinking.

Television and film

1960s Batman

The first appearance of the Batboat was in the 1966 film Batman. It was subsequently used in seasons two and three of the 1960s Batman television series. It was created by Glastron Industries. Since Glastron was based in Austin, Texas, the world premiere of the 1966 "Batman" movie was also held there.

Mel Whitley and Robert Hammond designed the Batboat from a Glastron V-174. They added a red flashing beacon, glowing eyes, bazooka hatches, seats for both Batman and Robin at the front of the boat, twin wind screens, a center console, an outdrive jet cover, and an aft to deck cover with a glowing Bat-Signal on the tail fin. Although the boat was powered by a Merc Cruiser L-6 stern drive and At wood Corporation manufactured the hardwire, a water squirter and a jet nozzle were added to make the Batboat look like it was nuclear-powered.  It took 31 days to build.

Eventually, a replica was built of the Batboat. When the Batman television show was cancelled, Glastron used the two Batboats for promotions on tours. After much touring, the boats were sold. One boat went to a Glastron dealer who was a Shriner. He used it in various Shriner parades. This Batboat was then moved to the Car Stars museum in Gatlinburg, Tennessee.

Batman: The Animated Series
The Batboat was also featured in Batman: The Animated Series. It could also be used as a submarine.

Batman Returns
A darker version was used in Batman Returns as the Batskiboat. Batman uses the vehicle near the climax of the film to travel through Gotham's sewer system towards the Penguin's lair.

Batman Forever
A second Batboat appears in the film Batman Forever, piloted by Robin, and is quickly destroyed by the Riddler and Two-Face. In the same film, a version of the Batwing is shown to have a cockpit that can transform into a submersible vehicle should the air vehicle be shot down.

The Batman
The Batboat is also used in The Batman. This one has similarity to the Batskiboat but it has black and blue color. This version somehow gives this boat the appearance that it is hovering over the water rather than touching it. It holds three people and is equipped with an on-board computer which can be activated from his belt. It has submersible capabilities like in Batman: The Animated Series. In "The Icy Depth", when trapped in ice it can generate enough heat to break through the ice.

Batman Beyond
A submarine appeared in the episode "Earth Mover" in Batman Beyond. It was used by Terry McGinnis, the new Batman, to navigate Gotham city's underground rivers.

Superman/Batman: Apocalypse
The Bat Skiboat makes an appearance early in Superman/Batman: Apocalypse.

Lego Batman: The Movie - DC Super Heroes Unite
The Batboat makes an appearance in Lego Batman: The Movie - DC Super Heroes Unite.

Video games

Batman
In the 1986 computer game Batman, the player has to collect seven pieces of the Batcraft, a hovercraft-type vehicle, from the depths of the Batcave in order to complete the game.

Lego Batman: The Video Game
The Batboat is one of the playable vehicles Lego Batman: The Video Game. In the game, it has the abilities to shoot, throw rope, and jump with more force on ramps.

Batman: Arkham City
The Batboat is mentioned in Batman: Arkham City as being used by Batman to attempt to stop Joker's escape from Arkham Asylum, that took place before the events of Arkham City. In the tie-in comic, it's shown Batman has multiple (at least three) Batboats.

Lego Batman
A hovercraft version of the Batboat is featured in the Lego Batman building toy set 7780 Batboat: the Hunt for Killer Croc.

References

External links
The Unofficial Batboat Biography
Television - Batman: The Series - Gadgets - Batboat
Movies - Batman Returns - Gadgets - Batskiboat
Movies - Batman Forever - Gadgets - Batboat
Character Profiles - Gadgets - Batboat
Batboat from "Batman Forever" (1995)

Fictional elements introduced in 1946